Jean-Claude Barclay and Françoise Dürr were the defending champions but lost in the final 6–2, 6–4 against Kim Warwick and Evonne Goolagong.

Seeds

Draw

Finals

Top half

Bottom half

References

External links
1972 French Open – Doubles draws and results at the International Tennis Federation

Mixed Doubles
French Open by year – Mixed doubles